Guayaquil, officially Santiago de Guayaquil, is the second  largest city in Ecuador and also the nation's economic capital and main port. The city is the capital of Guayas Province and the seat of Guayaquil Canton. The city is located on the west bank of the Guayas River, which flows into the Pacific Ocean at the Gulf of Guayaquil.

Name 

The origin of the name of the city of Santiago de Guayaquil has been much discussed, although historians agree that it is pre-Hispanic. Since the founding of the city in 1534, it is linked to the name of Santiago in memory of its patron saint, Santiago, apostle of  Christ, who is also patron saint of several other Spanish American colonial cities, such as Santiago de Chile, as he is of Spain itself.

One of the theories, based on a romantic legend, transmitted orally from one generation to another, attributes the origin of the name Guayaquil to the joining of the name of a leader named Guayas and of his wife Quil, symbols of the local resistance that — according to local tradition — chose to fight to the death (and as a final act, set fire to the town), rather than surrender to the Spanish conquerers.

The existence of a town with a name similar to Guayaquil, located near the city of Durán (Autopista Durán-Boliche km. 23), has brought investigations by archeologists and historians, who agree that the town, when it was conquered, was ruled by a man named :es:Guayaquile. What was not decided was whether the name was given by the man to the town, or the town to the man. But the researcher Ángel Véliz Mendoza, in his book on the man :es:Guayaquile, states that there are at least seven references to the toponym in pre-1543 documents. It is believed that the name Guayaquil is taken from the population’s final home, in lands of the chief :es:Guayaquile. This region was occupied by the nation "chronos," whose archeological name is :es:cultura Milagro-Quevedo.

After several location changes and fires, the city was finally founded in 1547, and named the "Muy Noble y Muy Leal Ciudad de Santiago de Guayaquil" ("Very noble and very loyal city of Santiago de Guayaquil"). After the independence of the city in 1820, the words "very noble and very loyal" disappeared because the city was no longer part of the Spanish empire. Today, the official name of Santiago de Guayaquil is seldom used outside of official contexts.

History
Guayaquil was founded on July 25, 1538 by Spanish conqueror Francisco de Orellana in the location of a native village and given the name  ('Most Noble and Most Loyal City of Santiago of Guayaquil').

On April 20, 1687, Guayaquil was attacked and looted by English and French pirates under the command of George d'Hout (English) and Picard and Groniet (French).  Of more than 260 pirates, 35 were killed and 46 were wounded; 75 defenders of the city died and more than 100 were wounded.

In 1709, the English captains Woodes Rogers, Etienne Courtney, and William Dampier, along with a crew of 110, looted Guayaquil and demanded ransom; however, they departed suddenly and without collecting the ransom after an epidemic of yellow fever broke out.

In colonial times Guayaquil was the chief Spanish shipyard in the Pacific, although some navigators considered that Valdivia (now in Chile) had better conditions. Guayaquil was a stopover point in the commerce between Asia and Latin America conducted by Philippines-based Manila galleons, which had links to Acapulco in Mexico and terminated with a node in Callao, Peru.

The owners were in charge but  enslaved had some freedoms in exchange for paying their owners a fee (the ) every day. Slaves like María Chiquinquirá would work in people'so houses and lots of slaves worked alongside free workers in the shipyards. Chiquinquirá is a hero because she successfully went to court in 1794 to argue her freedom.

On October 9, 1820, almost without bloodshed, a group of civilians, supported by soldiers from the "Granaderos de Reserva" battalion quartered in Guayaquil, led by the Peruvian Colonel Gregorio Escobedo, overwhelmed the resistance of the Royalist guards and arrested the Spanish authorities. Guayaquil declared independence from Spain, becoming "Provincia Libre de Guayaquil", and José Joaquín de Olmedo was named  (Civilian Chief) of Guayaquil.

Departing from Guayaquil, General Antonio José de Sucre, sent by Simón Bolivar and supported by a division promised by José de San Martín, led the allied independence army in the Battle of Pichincha that sealed the independence of the Gran Colombia and also what would become the future Republic of Ecuador.

On July 26, 1822, generals José de San Martín and Simón Bolívar held a meeting in Guayaquil to plan how to the complete the independence of Perú and with it all of Spanish South America.

In 1829, the city was invaded by the Peruvian Army, which occupied it for seven months.

In 1860, the city was the site of the Battle of Guayaquil, the last of a series of military conflicts between the forces of the Provisional Government, led by Gabriel García Moreno and General Juan José Flores, and the forces of the Supreme Chief of Guayas, General Guillermo Franco, whose government was recognized as possessing sovereignty over the Ecuadorian territory by Peruvian president Ramón Castilla. Moreno's forces were victorious, countering Peruvian influence over Ecuador.

In 1896, large portions of the city were destroyed by a fire.

In 1922, workers in the city went on a general strike lasting three days, ending after at least 300 people were killed by military and police.

In 2020, the city was hit hard by the coronavirus pandemic. Its medical and mortuary services were overwhelmed to the point where bodies lay in the streets. Almost 6,000 more deaths were recorded in the first two weeks of April than the average for the same period in other years.

Economy

Guayaquileños''' main sources of income are formal and informal trade, business, agriculture and aquaculture. Most commerce consists of small and medium businesses, adding an important informal economy occupation that gives thousands of guayaquileños employment.

The Port of Guayaquil is Ecuador's most important commercial port; most international import and export merchandise passes through the Gulf of Guayaquil. As the largest city in the country, most industries are located either in the city or its peripheral areas.

Ongoing projects seek urban regeneration as a principal objective of the growth of the city's commercial districts, as the increase of capital produces income. These projects in the city driven by the recent mayors have achieved this goal after investing large sums of money. The current municipal administration aims to convert Guayaquil into a place for first-class international tourism and multinational businesses.

Government
 Guayaquil's mayor was Cynthia Viteri, the second elected female mayor in the city's history, the first being Elsa Bucaram in 1988. Previous mayor Jaime Nebot supported her. He began a campaign of construction projects for the city in the early 2000s to attract tourism, that included the "urban regeneration" plan which reconstructed the city's main tourist streets' sidewalks and upgraded the city's chaotic transit system with multiple infrastructure projects (speedways, bridges, overhead passages, tunnels, etc.).

In August 2006, the city's first rapid transit bus system, Metrovia, opened to provide a quicker, high-capacity service. One of the main projects was called Malecón 2000 , the renovation of the waterfront promenade (malecón) along the Guayas River. Another project was the creation of the Nuevo Parque Histórico, a park in a housing development area that is called Entre Ríos because it lies between the Daule and Babahoyo Rivers (which merge to form the Guayas River), in a mangrove wetland area. The park cost the city about US$7 million.

In 2013, the national government led by Rafael Correa built two pedestrian bridges connecting downtown Guayaquil, Santay Island, and the town of Durán, to allow people to make ecotourism trips and return the same day.

Geography
Guayaquil is the nation's second largest city and the capital of Guayas Province.

Guayaquil faces major earthquake threats due to its soil stratigraphy and location on the ring of fire and the south of the North-Andean subduction zone. The city can be easily damaged by earthquakes as its weak and compressible soil is composed of deep soft sediments over hard rocks and deposits in a brackish environment. Also, the city itself is strongly affected by the subduction of the active Ecuadorian margin, an intraplate region where active faults locate; and the Guayaquil-Babahoyo strike-slip fault system, formed as the North Andean Block drifts northward. The tsunami threat is caused by the nearby Gulf of Guayaquil which also is one of the major locations on the Earth where earthquakes tend to happen all the time. It has complex tectonic features such as the Posorja and the Jambeli –two major east–west trending detachment systems; the Puna-Santa Clara northeast-southwest trending fault system; and the Domito north-south trending fault system; that have developed since the Pleistocene times. Tsunami threats are only predicted for coastal farming zones, not the main populated areas.

Guayaquil, along with most of the coastal region, was impacted by the April 16, 2016 earthquake of 7.8 magnitude. A bridge that was above a major artery, Avenida de las Americas, collapsed in the early evening of April 16, killing two people.

Climate
Guayaquil features a tropical savanna climate (Köppen: Aw''). Between January and April, the climate is hot and humid with heavy rainfall, especially during El Niño years when it increases dramatically and flooding usually occurs. The rest of the year (from May through December), however, rainfall is minimal due to the cooling influence of the Humboldt Current, with usually cloudy mornings and afternoons, and evening breezes.

Guayaquil city sectors

Here you can find the list of Neighborhoods and Parishes of Guayaquil

Demographics

Food

Typical Guayaquil cuisine includes mostly seafood dishes such as encebollado, ceviche, cazuela, and encocado (shrimp or tuna with a coconut sauce and rice).

During breakfast, patacones and bolon (fried plantain with cheese mashed and given a rounded shape) play a big role. These plantain dishes are often accompanied with bistec de carne or encebollado de pescado. 

Another prominent breakfast dish are empanadas "de viento" made with wheat flour and stretchy cheese or empanadas "de verde" plantain based with mozzarella cheese.  

Pan de yuca similar to pão de queijo usually served with "yogur persa" is a typical snack in Guayaquil. With the rise in middle eastern migration, shawarma shops dot the city. 

Chifa dishes like arroz chaufa, tallarin saltado, and sopa Fui Chi Fu are common fast food options. 

Some other original dishes of Guayaquil are the plantain ball soup (based on peanuts and green plantains creating a green plantain ball filled with meat and other ingredients). Bollo analagous to [hallacas] is another typical dish of this city that also the main ingredient is the green plantain and seafood. Just to mention others are the biche, sango de mariscos, and arroz con pescado frito (rice with fried fish)

Arroz con menestra y carne asada (rice with stew and roast meat), churrasco, Guatita, Caldo de mondongo, Humitas, Maduro lampriado, Maduro con queso, Tripita, are some more dishes included in the great and diverse gastronomy of the city.

Notable people

Arts and literature
 Daniela Alcívar Bellolio (b. 1982, Guayaquil)
 Félix Arauz (b. 1935, Guayaquil)
 Theo Constanté (1934–2014, Guayaquil)
 José de la Cuadra (1903, Guayaquil – d. 1941, Guayaquil)
 Alfredo Pareja Diezcanseco (1908, Guayaquil – d. 1993, Quito)
 Carmen Febres-Cordero de Ballén (b. 1829, Guayaquil – d. 1893, Valparaíso)
 Araceli Gilbert (b. 1913, Guayaquil – d. 1993, Quito)
 Enrique Gil Gilbert (1912, Guayaquil – d. 1973, Guayaquil)
 Julio Jaramillo (b. 1935, Guayaquil – d. 1978, Guayaquil)*
 Joaquín Gallegos Lara (b. 1909, Guayaquil – d. 1947, Guayaquil)
 Numa Pompilio Llona (b. 1832, Guayaquil – d. 1907, Guayaquil)
 Demetrio Aguilera Malta (b. 1909, Guayaquil – d. 1981, Mexico)
 Luis Miranda (b. 1932, Guayaquil)
 Luis Molinari (b. 1929, Guayaquil)
 Xavier Blum Pinto (b. 1957, Guayaquil)
 José Martínez Queirolo (b. 1931, Guayaquil – d. 2008, Guayaquil)
 Víctor Manuel Rendón (b. 1859, Guayaquil – d. 1940, Guayaquil)
 Enrique Tábara (b. 1930, Guayaquil)
 Jorge Velarde (b. 1960, Guayaquil)
 Juan Villafuerte (b. 1945, Guayaquil – d. 1977, Barcelona, Spain)
 Eugenia Viteri (b. 1928, Guayaquil)

Others
Olga Álava, Miss Ecuador Earth 2011, Miss Earth 2011
Noralma Vera Arrata, ballerina and choreographer 
Frederick Ashton, British choreographer and dancer
Geovanni Camacho, football player
María Elisa Camargo, actress
Danilo Carrera, actor and model 
Fernanda Cornejo, fashion model and Miss International 2011
Beatriz Parra Durango, opera singer
Felipe Caicedo, footballer
María Capovilla, oldest person
Jorge Delgado, swimmer
Beatriz Parra Durango, opera singer
Jenny Estrada, writer
Jorge Perrone Galarza, politician
Karina Galvez, poet
Adalberto Ortiz, poet
Gerardo, rapper
Andrés Gómez, tennis player
Mike Judge, American animator and television writer
Guillermo Lasso, former President of Ecuador
Rita Lecumberri, writer
Demetrio Aguilera Malta, writer
Roberto Manrique, actor
Debbie Mucarsel-Powell, American politician
Francisco Nazareno, footballer
Albert Paulsen, actor
Joao Plata, footballer
Jorge Saade, violinist
Hugo Savinovich, wrestler
Pancho Segura, tennis player
Benjamín Urrutia, academic
Pedro Jorge Vera, writer
Alex Jimbo Viteri, violinist
Rosa Borja de Ycaza, writer
Presley Norton Yoder, archeologist
María del Tránsito Sorroza, midwife and formerly enslaved woman

Education

Biblioteca Municipal de Guayaquil (Municipal Library of Guayaquil) serves as the public library of Guayaquil.
The city has several universities, including the University of Guayaquil (founded in 1867), the Universidad Catolica de Santiago de Guayaquil, the Escuela Superior Politecnica del Litoral (ESPOL), and the Universidad de Especialidades Espiritu Santo.

Religion
The largest religion in Guayaquil is Christianity.

Sports

There are two major association football clubs; the Barcelona Sporting Club and the Club Sport Emelec. Each club has its own stadium; the Estadio Monumental Banco Pichincha is the home of the "Barcelonistas" while the Estadio George Capwell is the home of the "Emelecistas". These two teams have a long history of rivalry in Guayaquil and when these two teams play against each other the game is called "El Clásico del Astillero".

The city is the birthplace of Francisco Segura Cano; and Andrés Gómez and Nicolás Lapentti, Ecuador's two most successful tennis players, now both retired. The "Abierto de Tenis Ciudad de Guayaquil" is a tennis tournament organised in Guayaquil by Gómez and Luis Morejon, and held annually in November.

Another major event in the city is the Guayaquil Marathon, which has been held every year on the first weekend of October since 2005. These race is certified by the (AIMS) Association of International Marathons and Distance Races.

The sports & Ecological Park called Parque Samanes de Guayaquil is a park with courts for soccer, tennis, volleyball, and basketball, two lakes, a soccer stadium and an amphi theatre for open air concerts and events. It is connected to a forest reserve with trails for cycling and walking, as well as installations for climbing and zip-lining.

Universities

Some of Guayaquil's main universities are:
 Escuela Superior Politécnica del Litoral
 Universidad de Especialidades Espíritu Santo
 University of Guayaquil
 Universidad Católica de Santiago de Guayaquil
 Universidad Laica Vicente Rocafuerte
 Universidad Casa Grande
 Universidad Tecnológica Ecotec
 Universidad Santa María
 Blue Hill College
 Universidad Del Pacífico – Ecuador
 Institute of Graphics Arts and Digital Science
 Universidad Politécnica Salesiana

Transport
Guayaquil is located along national Highway 40 and is near Highway 25.

Among Guayaquil's major trading points are the seaport, the largest in Ecuador and one of the biggest handlers of shipping on the shores of the Pacific; and José Joaquín de Olmedo International Airport.

José Joaquín de Olmedo International Airport, though using the same runways, had its passenger terminal completely rebuilt in 2006 and was renamed. The old passenger terminal is now a convention centre.

Guayaquil is served by a bus rapid transit system, Metrovia, which opened in 2006. The system has three lines and is supplemented by 35 feeder routes, carrying a total of 400,000 daily passengers.

The Empresa de Ferrocarriles Ecuatorianos offers tourist rail service to Quito from the neighboring city of Durán, Ecuador, located across the Guayas River from Guayaquil.

Twin towns – sister cities
Guayaquil is twinned with:
 Houston, United States (1987)

 Shanghai, China (2001)
 Santiago, Chile

See also
 Casa del Hombre Doliente – care facility for those suffering a terminal illness
 Newspapers of Guayaquil
 Aerovia (Guayaquil)

References

External links

 
Images of Guayaquil before and After
 Municipalidad de Guayaquil

 
Guayaquil Canton
Populated places in Guayas Province
Populated coastal places in Ecuador
Port cities in Ecuador
Provincial capitals in Ecuador
Populated places established in 1538
1538 establishments in the Spanish Empire